The Revolution of Sweden is a 1706 tragedy by the British writer Catharine Cockburn.

The original Haymarket cast included Barton Booth as Gustavus, Thomas Betterton as Arwide, John Corey as Erici, Benjamin Husband as Viceroy, John Bowman as Archbishop and Elizabeth Barry as Constanta.

References

Bibliography
 Burling, William J. A Checklist of New Plays and Entertainments on the London Stage, 1700-1737. Fairleigh Dickinson Univ Press, 1992.
 Nicoll, Allardyce. History of English Drama, 1660-1900, Volume 2. Cambridge University Press, 2009.

1706 plays
West End plays
Tragedy plays
Plays by Catharine Trotter Cockburn